The 2006/07 season of the Bonearian football League started on October 27, 2006 and the final was played on August 3, 2007.

The championship was played over 3 phases. First phase with all 7 teams, followed by a playoff with the top 4 teams and then a final with the 2 top teams. Matches started at the stadium of Kralendijk but, due to renovations of the pitch, were continued at Antonio Trenidat Stadium in Rincon. With home court advantage both teams of Rincon qualified for the final for the second time in history. Vespo defeated Real Rincon 1-0 to become champion only for the second time in their history.

The season ended officially on September 14, 2007, with a Supercup (held for the first time) between the champions Vespo and the best placed team of the regular season Real Rincon. Real Rincon took revenge of their loss in the final by defeating their rivals 4-2.

Regular season 
Teams face each other 3 times. Top four teams qualify for the semifinal playoffs

Standing

Playoffs 
Teams face each other 2 times. Top two teams qualify for the final.

Standing

Final

Supercup

Abbreviations

External links 
  RSSSF
  Extra

Bonaire League seasons
Bonaire
football
football